Next Magazine was a Chinese weekly magazine, published online in Hong Kong from 1990 to 2021. Owned by Jimmy Lai, the magazine was the number one news magazines in both markets in terms of audited circulation and AC Nielsen reports. A Taiwanese version of Next Magazine was published from 2001 to 2018, and the online version of Taiwan's Next Magazine ended in 2020.

General 
Founded on 15 March 1990, Next magazine was the second most popular magazine in Hong Kong, until Jimmy Lai's other magazine, Sudden Weekly, shuttered in 2015. It was published every Wednesday and cost 20 HKD. Next Magazine covered current affairs, political, economic, social and business issues, and entertainment news.  The final print edition of the Hong Kong Next Magazine was published on 15 March 2018. After the sister newspaper, Apple Daily and its parent company are raided by Hong Kong police due to national security law charges and its executives are arrested, the online publication of Next Magazine ended on 23 June 2021.

Next Magazine Taiwan branch was established in 2001 and its first issue was published on 31 May 2001. With strong TV advertising support, the first issue's print run of 270,000 sold out within four hours. Although the two magazines had the same structure, Taiwanese Next magazine was locally edited and its contents were different from its sister publication in Hong Kong. It was published every Thursday and cost NTD 75. The Taiwanese Next Magazine published its last print edition on 4 April 2018. Online publication of Next Magazine in Taiwan ended on 29 February 2020.

Structure of the magazine
The editorial staff at Next Magazine are split into 5 sections: News, Financial, Features & technology, Entertainment & lifestyle and Social pages.

Audience
Next magazine is popular among the middle-classes in Hong Kong. The ACNielsen Hong Kong in March 2002: Media Index RARD Report (ACNielsen RARD Report) showed that 51% of its readers were aged 35 or above, 69% of them had completed secondary or higher education and 62% of them had monthly household incomes of 2‧104 HKD or more.

Readership
In 1991, the magazine became the most popular magazine in Hong Kong with the highest pass-along readership. Its circulation was 7.5‧104 and readership was 3.15‧105. By 1995, its audited circulation had more than doubled to 162,521 and readership had jumped to 1.06‧106.  The number of pages in the magazine had also doubled, mainly due to an increase in advertising. The average (weekly) circulation during the period of 1 April to 30 June 2003 was 161,919. According to the March 2003 ACNielsen RARD Report, Next Magazine had the second highest readership among weekly magazines in Hong Kong after Sudden Weekly, its sister entertainment news magazine under the same company.

Style and political position

The magazine's political position is libertarian in that it supports minimum government control on economic matters. It is also known for its pro-democracy position.

Significant controversies
Next magazine has often been criticised. Complaints about the magazine can be categorised into two types although it has a relatively large market:

 Since the Control of Obscene and Indecent Articles Ordinance (Cap.390) was enacted in Hong Kong in 1994, Next Magazine has violated the law about 17 times and has received fines in the range [5‧103HKD,1.4‧104HKD] (http://ent.sina.com.cn/s/h/2002-10-11/1158105895.html). The Taiwan version of Next Magazine has also violated the law 4 times.  The public complained that the magazine posted the death portrait of Hong Kong actress Pauline Chan Bo-Lin upon her death in Aug 2002.  The magazine was fined 5‧103 HKD in respect of publication (http://ent.sina.com.cn/s/h/2002-08-20/171096497.html).
 Next Magazine has been involved in several libel cases; the most significant case being a report in which it was claimed that there was a loss of 7‧107 HKD by Project Hope, a charitable organisation in China, in January 1994. The magazine lost the case in 2000, and was fined 3.5‧106 HKD (https://web.archive.org/web/20040220071741/http://fpeng.peopledaily.com.cn/200006/22/eng20000622_43648.html).

Online version 
There is an online version available for subscription from Hong Kong, Taiwan and overseas readers. atnext.com is a web site that contains news, entertainment and information.  It also provides an environment for companies to advertise. Online Advertising on Atnext.com is represented by Pixel Media HK Limited (www.pixelmedia-asia.com). Its innovative ads help many companies explore new markets and maintain existing markets.

In November 1999, when the Hong Kong online version of Next magazine was first launched, people could read the magazine free of charge on the internet, but a subscription fee is now charged.  Hong Kong subscribers, by paying 388 HKD y−1, can browse the websites of Next magazine, AppleDaily, Easy finder, Sudden weekly and Eat & travel weekly.  Overseas subscribers can browse the websites by paying 498 HKD y−1. The website on horse racing (https://web.archive.org/web/20161221195613/http://racing.atnext.com/) has to be subscribed to separately (1 888 HKD y−1).

Next Media network
Besides Next magazine, Next Media limited also owns one newspaper and several magazines: the Apple Daily (蘋果日報 pinyin: Píng Guǒ Rì Bào), Easy Finder (壹本便利 pinyin: Yī Běn Biàn Lì ), Sudden Weekly (忽然1週 pinyin: Hū Rán Yī Zhōu ) and Eat & Travel Weekly (飲食男女 pinyin: Yǐn Shí Nán Nǚ ). All of which are printed by Database Gateway Limited since October 2001, but the major shares of the following two magazines, Sudden Weekly and Eat & Travel Weekly has sold to Malaysian media conglomerate company Astro All Asia Networks plc in November 2006, and sold the rest of shares of these two magazines in the end of 2008.

Following the success of Next Magazine and Apple Daily in Hong Kong, the Taiwan branch of Next Media Publishing Limited, a wholly owned subsidiary of Next Media Limited, was set up in Taiwan on 31 May 2001. The emergence of Taiwan Apple Daily and Next Magazine introduced a completely different way of reporting in Taiwan.  Next Media Network has confidence in being in the top three in the newspaper sector in Taiwan by using a new reporting style and its high quality of publication.

Next Media Network is a great success in Hong Kong. Between 31 March 2002 and 31 March 2003, its total sales and net profit are about $2,150,100,000 and $367,600,000 respectively.  Comparing to 2002, the total sales has increased by 91.8% while the net profit has increased by 1284.4%.  For Next Magazine only, it just took 3 years to move to making a profit.

Major competitor 
East Week has been the major competitor of Next Magazine for more than 10 years. East Week was first published by the Oriental Group in 1992, 2 years after Next Magazine. East Magazine largely resembles Next Magazine in terms of reporting styles and coverage the logo of East Week is also similar to that of Next Magazine. East Magazine does not have a significant effect on sales of Next Magazine'.  It is now owned by Global China Group Holdings Limited and transfer of staff between the two magazines is common.

Awards
Besides its large readership, Next Magazine also won a lot of awards.
 1999 "Focus at the frontline 99" – 1st runner-up in the Spot news category
 1998 Human rights press awards – 2 special merit awards
 1997 "Focus 97" – Champion in photo essay category & 1st runner-up in feature category
 1996
 HKDA "Design 96" show – editorial design merit award
 Hong Kong institute of professional photographers awards – Kodak award in stories category
 1995
 Hong Kong Institute of Professional Photographers awards – Kodak award in editorial (single) category, bronze award in editorial (single) category, merit award in editorial (single) category & Kodak award in publishing category
 Hong Kong news awards – The best magazine reporting award
 1994 HKDA "Design 94" show – 10 book design silver award & editorial design merit awards

Major court cases involved (Citations)
 Next Magazine publishing ltd & anor v Ma Ching Fat [2003] 1 HKC 579
 Morinda international Hong Kong ltd v Next Magazine publishing ltd & ors [2003] 1 HKC 492
 Oriental press group ltd & anor v Next Magazine publishing ltd & ors [2001] 3 HKC 159
 Next Magazine publishing ltd & ors v Oriental Daily publisher ltd [2000] 2 HKC 557
 China youth development ltd v Next Magazine publishing ltd & ors (HCA6206/1994)
 Hong Kong polytechnic university v Next magazine [1996] 2 HKLR 260

See also
 Media in Hong Kong
 Communications in Hong Kong
 Newspapers in Hong Kong

References

Translation:
Pinyin translated by CozyChinese.COM

External links
 Next Magazine Channel Hong Kong 
 Next Magazine Hong Kong 
 Next Magazine Hong Kong 
 Next Magazine Taiwan 
 Next Media Limited 

Articles
 How does Next Magazine affect the press and the publishing market in Taiwan:https://web.archive.org/web/20031210070352/http://www.bnext.com.tw/mag/2001_05/2001_05_1490.html (Chinese)
 The contributions of Next Magazine: http://capm.giga-tv.com/larry/article/231816792 (Chinese)
 Article related to the launching of Next Magazine in Taiwan: https://web.archive.org/web/20040401072441/http://com.giga-tv.com/sooner/article/42581866 (Chinese), http://taipeitimes.com/News/biz/archives/2001/05/31/88099 (English)
 Commentary written on the publishing of Next Magazine in Taiwan: https://web.archive.org/web/20030814184344/http://www.npf.org.tw/PUBLICATION/EC/090/EC-C-090-136.htm (Chinese)
 The effect of Next Magazine'' on Taiwan press (Chinese)http://atj.yam.org.tw/mw2239.htm

1990 establishments in Hong Kong
2021 disestablishments in Hong Kong
2001 establishments in Taiwan
2018 disestablishments in Taiwan
Celebrity magazines
Chinese-language magazines
Defunct magazines published in Hong Kong
Defunct magazines published in Taiwan
Magazines established in 1990
Magazines established in 2001
Magazines disestablished in 2018
Next Digital
Online magazines with defunct print editions
Weekly magazines published in Hong Kong